Rungoo is a coastal locality in the Cassowary Coast Region, Queensland, Australia.

History 
Rungoo was named after the former Rungoo railway station, which was in turn named on 26 June 1925 by the Queensland Railways Department. It is believed to be an Aboriginal word meaning camping place.

Geography
The Hinchinbrook Channel and its inlets form the eastern boundary.

Road infrastructure
The Bruce Highway runs through from south to north.

References 

Cassowary Coast Region
Coastline of Queensland
Localities in Queensland